Clóvis Bornay (January 10, 1916 – October 9, 2005) was a Brazilian museologist, actor, and maker of Carnival costumes for more than 40 years, which made him famous throughout the nation, and he continues to be honored and the subject at Carnival parades today. He also composed some of the Carnival songs in the 1960s and 1970s and was the costume designer for the Salgueiro parade in 1966; Unidos de Lucas from 1967 to 1969; GRES Portela in 1969 and 1970, where he won at this carnival for his theme "Legends and Mysteries of the Amazon"; GRES Mocidade Independente de Padre Miguel in 1972 and 1973; and lastly Unidos da Tijuca in 1973.

He was born of Spanish and Swiss parents in Nova Friburgo, near Rio de Janeiro, where he died on October 9, 2005, at age 89. He started designing the 1930s until eventually starting at carnivals.

Filmography

References

Carnivals in Brazil
1916 births
2005 deaths
Brazilian people of Swiss descent
Brazilian people of Spanish descent
People from Nova Friburgo
Festival directors
20th-century Brazilian people